This is the discography of Dutch country pop singer Ilse DeLange.

Albums

Studio albums

Live albums

Compilation albums

Singles

Music videos

References

Country music discographies
Pop music discographies
Rock music discographies
Discographies of Dutch artists